Katsukawa may refer to:

Katsukawa school, school of Japanese ukiyo-e art, founded by Miyagawa Shunsui
Katsukawa Shunchō, designer of ukiyo-e style Japanese woodblock prints, active from c. 1783 to c. 1795
Katsukawa Shunkō I (1743–1812), designer of ukiyo-e style Japanese woodblock prints in Edo (Tokyo)
Katsukawa Shunsen, designer of books and ukiyo-e style Japanese woodblock prints
Katsukawa Shunshō (1726–1792), Japanese painter and printmaker in the ukiyo-e style, and the leading artist of the Katsukawa school

Japanese-language surnames